Éric Le Sage (born 15 June 1964 in Aix-en-Provence) is a contemporary French classical pianist.

Biography 
After he finished his studies at the Conservatoire de Paris, Le Sage went to London to improve by Maria Curcio.

Éric Le Sage is best known for his interpretations of romantic music, Schumann, but also for recording the complete piano music of Francis Poulenc.

His curiosity for the unknown works led him to play more than twenty rare concertos by Dvořák, Schoenberg, Stravinsky, Britten and others. Lesage is a guest of renowned groups such as the Orchestre philharmonique de Radio France, the Royal Scottish National Orchestra or the Dresden Philharmonic.

Prizes 
He was the winner of the Porto International Piano Competition in 1985, of the Robert Schumann International Competition for Pianists and Singers at Zwickau in 1989 and of the Leeds competition in 1990.

Festivals 
He has participated in festivals such as the Festival de La Roque-d'Anthéron, Festival de Radio France et Montpellier, Menton, Évian or Strasbourg. On 17 August 2010, Éric le Sage was in Jonzac on the occasion of the festival organized by the cultural association of the Val de Seugne; he was then accompanied by clarinetist Paul Meyer and cellist François Salque.

References

External links 
 Éric Le Sage on SOLEA
 Éric Le Sage on Piano Bleu
 Eric Le Sage : Je n'aime pas le Beethoven pâteux on France Musique
 Éric Le Sage (Piano) on Bach Cantatas Website
 Schumann Presto Passionato, Eric Le Sage, piano on YouTube

1964 births
Living people
21st-century French male classical pianists
Academic staff of the Hochschule für Musik Freiburg
Musicians from Aix-en-Provence